Asadhulla Abdulla (born 19 October 1990) is a Maldivian footballer who plays for Maziya.

International career
Abdulla made his debut for the Maldives' senior team in its first match of the 2012 Nehru Cup against Nepal in the starting line-up on 23 August 2012. He was replaced by Ahmed Rasheed in the 63rd minute. Abdulla scored his first senior international goal in his debut match, giving the Maldives the lead in the 6th minute.

Career statistics

International

International goals

Under–23
Scores and results list Maldives U–23's goal tally first.

Senior team
Scores and results list Maldives goal tally first.

Honours

Maldives
SAFF Championship: 2018

References

1990 births
Living people
Maldivian footballers
Maldives international footballers
Club Valencia players
Association football forwards
Footballers at the 2010 Asian Games
Footballers at the 2014 Asian Games
Asian Games competitors for the Maldives